In computer science and data management, a commit is the making of a set of tentative changes permanent, marking the end of a transaction and providing Durability to ACID transactions. A commit is an act of committing. The record of commits is called the commit log.

Data management
A COMMIT statement in SQL ends a transaction within a relational database management system (RDBMS) and makes all changes visible to other users. The general format is to issue a BEGIN WORK (or BEGIN TRANSACTION, depending on the database vendor) statement, one or more SQL statements, and then the COMMIT statement. Alternatively, a ROLLBACK statement can be issued, which undoes all the work performed since BEGIN WORK was issued. A COMMIT statement will also release any existing savepoints that may be in use.

In terms of transactions, the opposite of commit is to discard the tentative changes of a transaction, a rollback.

See also
 Commit (version control)
 Atomic commit
 Two-phase commit protocol
 Three-phase commit protocol

Data management
SQL
Transaction processing